Britain's Secret Treasures is a British documentary shown on ITV hosted by Michael Buerk and Bettany Hughes. The programme features fifty archaeological discoveries that have been made in England, Wales and Scotland by members of the public. With the exception of a single find made in Scotland, all the objects featured were recorded by the Portable Antiquities Scheme (PAS).  Since the PAS was set up in 1997, some 800,000 objects have been registered with the scheme, many of them discovered by amateur metal detectorists.

The fifty finds have been selected by Hughes and a panel of experts from the British Museum (Roger Bland, Michael Lewis, Sally Worrell and Ian Richardson) and the Council for British Archaeology (Mike Heyworth) from among the nearly one million finds reported to the PAS on the basis of their historical and cultural significance, as well as on their aesthetic merit. The six episodes of Britain's Secret Treasures present the fifty objects in reverse order according to their importance as judged by the panel, in a countdown format, with the ten most important objects revealed during the sixth and final episode.

Taking the top slot in the countdown, as the most important object according to the panel, is a Lower Paleolithic flint handaxe made more than half a million years ago that was found on a beach in Happisburgh, Norfolk, in 2000 by a man taking his dog for a walk.

Episodes

Series 1

Series 2

List of objects

Objects submitted by viewers

At the beginning of the series viewers were invited to submit photographs of objects that they had found in England or Wales, so that experts from the British Museum could select the most interesting object, to be announced during the final episode.

The viewer-submitted object chosen as the most interesting by the panel was a small medieval bronze ornament in the form of an open book that was found in a field by the Pilgrims' Way at Bentley, Hampshire in 1997 (PAS record: HAMP527).  The open pages of the book are engraved with the Latin inscription Pax tibi, Marce, Evangelista meus meaning "Peace to you, Mark, my evangelist".  The traditional symbol of the Republic of Venice and the city of Venice is a winged lion (symbol of Mark the Evangelist), which is often depicted with one of its paws on an open book showing this same inscription, which suggests that the bronze book may have been a pilgrim's souvenir from Venice.

See also
 A History of the World in 100 Objects
 Our Top Ten Treasures

References

External links
 Portable Antiquities Scheme site, including episode guides with brief descriptions of all fifty objects

2012 British television series debuts
2013 British television series endings
British Museum in media
Documentary films about the visual arts
ITV (TV network) original programming